Laura Esposto (born 8 August 1978, Bologna, Italy) is a television presenter and model.

Broadcasting career
In 2007 she began presenting Five's Football Italiano in the United Kingdom, and has worked on Sky Sport in Italy since September 2009.

Other activities
On 28 May 2010 Esposto presented The "Italian Candidacy" for UEFA Euro 2016 in Geneva.

References 

1978 births
Living people
Mass media people from Bologna
Italian television personalities
Italian female models